Kosmos 140 ( meaning Cosmos 140), Soyuz 7K-OK No.3, was an uncrewed flight of the Soyuz spacecraft. It was the third attempted test flight of the Soyuz 7K-OK model, after orbital (Kosmos 133) and launch (Soyuz 11A511) failures of the first two Soyuz spacecraft.

History 
The follow-up to Kosmos 133 (Soyuz 7K-OK No.2), 28 November 1966, was planned for 14 December 1966 (Soyuz 7K-OK No.1) but ended disastrously. At liftoff, the Blok A core stage of the 11A57 booster ignited, but not the strap-ons. A shutdown command was immediately sent and pad crews began to move the service towers back in place and drain the propellants. This task was completed for the core stage and strap-ons, and then about 27 minutes after the attempted launch, the launch escape system (LES) suddenly fired. Its exhaust caused the Blok I third stage propellant tanks to overheat and explode, killing one person on the ground and damaging the Soyuz and core stage/strap-ons beyond repair. LC-31 was also badly damaged and took seven months of repair work in the frigid Kazakhstan winter to be restored to use. The reason for the LES firing was thought to be either a timer being activated due to the Earth's rotation affecting the gyroscope package in the launch vehicle or perhaps one of the service towers bumping it.

Launch 
In February 1967, the backup booster and spacecraft were set up at LC-1 and the planned mission could be carried out.

Return 
The spacecraft suffered attitude control problems and excessive fuel consumption in orbit, but remained controllable. An attempted maneuver on the 22nd orbit still showed problems with the control system. It malfunctioned yet again during retrofire, leading to a steeper than planned ballistic reentry and a  hole being burned in the heat shield.

Although the event would have been lethal to any human occupants, the capsule's recovery systems operated and the capsule crashed through the ice of the frozen Aral Sea, hundreds of kilometers short of its landing zone. The spacecraft finally sank in 10 metres of water and had to be retrieved by divers. The test performance was nonetheless deemed "good enough"; the crewed docking missions of Soyuz 1 and Soyuz 2 was approved for the next flight.

References 

Soyuz uncrewed test flights
Kosmos satellites
1967 in the Soviet Union
Spacecraft launched in 1967